Father & Son: Dangerous Relations is a 1993 made-for-TV film directed by Georg Stanford Brown and starring Louis Gossett Jr. and Blair Underwood. The film aired on NBC on April 19, 1993.

Plot
A man is paroled from prison early in order to keep tabs on another parolee, the man's estranged son.

Cast
Louis Gossett Jr. as Leonard Clay
Blair Underwood as Jared Williams
Rae Dawn Chong as Yvonne
David Harris as Mario
Christopher M. Brown as Tyrell
Eddie De Harp as Dion
Luke Askew as The Warden
Clarence Williams III as Raymond
Tony Plana as Torres

References

1993 television films
1993 films
NBC network original films
American prison films
Films directed by Georg Stanford Brown
1990s American films